Sérgio Paulo Marceneiro da Conceição (born 15 November 1974) is a Portuguese professional football manager and former player who mostly played as a right winger. He is the current manager of Porto.

Throughout his career, he played for ten teams in five countries. After gaining international recognition with Porto he switched to Italy, where he appeared for three clubs, winning domestic and European honours at Lazio. He amassed Primeira Liga totals of 97 games and 13 goals over four seasons, adding 136 matches and 13 goals in Serie A.

Having won 56 caps for Portugal, Conceição represented the nation at Euro 2000 and the 2002 World Cup, reaching the semi-finals of the former. In 2012, he started working as a manager, winning three league titles for Porto and the double in 2019–20 and 2021–22.

Playing career

Club
Born in Coimbra, Conceição began his career playing for the youth teams of hometown's Associação Académica. He started professionally in the Liga de Honra, consecutively for F.C. Penafiel, Leça F.C. and F.C. Felgueiras, before moving to FC Porto in 1996; two highly successful years with the latter saw his runs down the right flank, combined with a good scoring record, help it to back-to-back Primeira Liga championships and a Taça de Portugal triumph.

Conceição joined S.S. Lazio and played a significant part in their 1998–99 UEFA Cup Winners' Cup success, while also scoring five goals in 33 games in his first season in Serie A. He also helped the team to a Scudetto, a Coppa Italia (in a 1999–2000 conquest of the double) and the 1999 UEFA Super Cup.

In July 2000, Conceição transferred to Parma A.C. as a makeweight in Hernán Crespo's transfer, along with Matías Almeyda. The following campaign, he was used in the same fashion in the transfer of Sébastien Frey, which saw him go to Inter Milan while Frey went in the other direction. After two seasons and a good number of starts, he left by mutual agreement and re-joined Lazio, leaving for former club Porto towards the end of 2003–04, again by mutual consent, and adding his third Portuguese national championship.

In summer 2004, Conceição signed for Belgium's Standard Liège on a one-year deal. He won the Belgian Golden Shoe for best player of the year in his first season. However, in March 2006, he was banned for three years – the first 4.5 months of the ban taking effect immediately and the rest suspended– depending on good behaviour, for spitting on an opposing player and assaulting a referee.

After the 2006–07 season, Conceição failed to win any silverware with Standard, finishing runner-up in 2005–06's league and losing the 2007 final of the Belgian Cup. He decided to move to Kuwait and Qadsia SC on an annual salary of €1.1 million but, quickly unsettled, left.

In January 2008, after failed deals in Portugal, Conceição agreed to join PAOK FC in Greece, signing an 18-month contract. His unlikely signing was largely attributed to club director of football Zisis Vryzas, and the presence of Portuguese manager Fernando Santos on the bench; though he initially struggled even to return to proper fitness levels, he was instantly given the number No. 7 shirt, once worn by legendary former player (and also chairman) Theodoros Zagorakis.

In 2008–09, Conceição was promoted to team captain. Along with compatriot Vieirinha, he was a regular on the team's wings and gradually became a fan favourite for his leadership and his devotion to the club; at the beginning of the following campaign, however, he was regularly troubled by knee injuries for the most part of October, managing only a few appearances.

International
Conceição played 56 times with the Portugal national team and scored 12 goals, his debut being on 9 November 1996 in a 1–0 home win against Ukraine for the 1998 FIFA World Cup qualifiers. In his last international game he was on the losing end of a 0–3 friendly defeat at the hands of Spain, on 6 September 2003.

Early in his international career, Conceição was not known for his scoring prowess but, at UEFA Euro 2000, Portugal reached the semi-finals with a major contribution from him: in the third and final match of the group stage, against defending champions Germany in Rotterdam, he netted a hat-trick for all of the game's goals; the national side had guaranteed first place in the first two rounds, so it played mostly with substitutes, but he cemented his place in the starting XI for the rest of the tournament and subsequent call-ups.

In qualifying for the 2002 World Cup, Conceição scored four goals as Portugal finished atop a group that also featured the Republic of Ireland and the Netherlands (netting against both).

Coaching career

Beginnings
On 13 October 2009, Conceição announced his decision to retire as a professional footballer, and to continue working at PAOK as technical director, accepting Vryzas' proposal for the seat left vacant when he assumed presidency early on. On 30 May 2010, a few weeks after Santos' resignation as manager, he left the Thessaloniki club and rejoined another former team, as part of Standard Liège's coaching staff led by Dominique D'Onofrio.

Olhanense
Conceição began his managerial career on 1 January 2012, replacing Daúto Faquirá at the helm of S.C. Olhanense in the Primeira Liga. His debut for the 10th-placed team was a 2–1 loss at C.S. Marítimo a week later, and they finished the season two positions higher. 

Conceição was reported to have left the Algarve on 9 August 2012, following disputes with the board, but days later he appeared with president Isidoro Sousa to say that it was not the case. He resigned early in the new year and took legal action against the club for delayed wages by requesting their bankruptcy.

Académica
On 8 April 2013, Conceição was hired as manager of his hometown team Académica de Coimbra, less than 24 hours after the club dismissed Pedro Emanuel from the job. They stood at 13th place when he joined, and his main goal was to avoid relegation. 

Conceição left at the end of the 2013–14 campaign, after leading the side to eighth place.

Braga
Conceição signed a two-year contract with S.C. Braga on 26 May 2014; the team had just finished the campaign one place below Académica with the same number of points, resulting in the first time in ten years that Braga was out of European competitions. He led them to a fourth place finish and to the final of the domestic cup. After the semi-final victory at Rio Ave FC's ground, he made the 24-mile journey home from Vila do Conde on foot as part of a bet made with his players. Braga lost the final in a penalty shootout to Sporting CP despite leading 2–0 at half time. Following this defeat, president António Salvador released an official statement that angered the manager, resulting in a "violent discussion" between the two and leading to the club's decision of sacking the latter.

Vitória Guimarães
On 22 September 2015, Conceição resurfaced with his fourth management position in the Portuguese top-flight, at Vitória de Guimarães. On 17 January 2016, he led the side to their first home win against FC Porto (1–0) in 14 years. He left at the end of the season by mutual consent, after a 10th place in the championship left them out of European competitions.

Nantes
Conceição was named manager of Ligue 1 club FC Nantes on 8 December 2016, replacing the dismissed René Girard at a side second from bottom. His debut five days later was a 3–1 home victory over Montpellier HSC in the last 16 of the Coupe de la Ligue, followed with a 2–0 league win at Angers SCO; his one season at the Stade de la Beaujoire resulted in a 7th-place finish.

In February 2017, Conceição was linked to the vacant managerial position at struggling Premier League title holders Leicester City, but Nantes chairman Waldemar Kita insisted he would see out his two-year contract. It was announced on 6 June that he had quit his position and accepted a proposal from Porto, citing personal reasons, including the possibility to live close to his family in Portugal.

Porto
In June 2017, after cutting ties with Nantes, Conceição replaced former teammate Nuno Espírito Santo at the helm of former side Porto. He was officially presented on the 8th, signing a two-year deal. In his first season, he led the club to the national championship after a five-year wait, and his contract was extended by another year. They reached the quarter-finals in the subsequent UEFA Champions League, where they were ousted by eventual winners Liverpool.

On 1 March 2019, Conceição signed another deal until 2021. They regained their title in 2019–20 with two games to spare, after S.L. Benfica's form worsened at the end of the campaign. Two weeks later, his team beat that opponent in the cup final to secure the double. The side again reached the last-eight in the Champions League, being defeated 2–1 on aggregate by Chelsea.

Conceição renewed his contract for three more years on 4 June 2021, until June 2024. The following 16 April, a 7–0 home rout of Portimonense S.C. equalled A.C. Milan and Olympiacos F.C.'s record of 58 league matches without losing. His third league title was sealed on 7 May, with a last-minute winner by Zaidu Sanusi at Benfica, and 15 days later a 3–1 defeat of C.D. Tondela decided the domestic cup final.

On 28 January 2023, Conceição won the first Taça da Liga in Porto's history with a 2–0 win over Sporting in Leiria, his third such final.

Style of play
A talented player, Conceição was mainly known for his speed, strength, and ability to cover the flank and get forward, also possessing good dribbling skills, crossing ability, and a fairly accurate shot. A versatile and hard-working midfielder, although he was usually deployed as a right winger, he was also capable of playing in a holding role.

Personal life
Coimbra's municipal government named a local 2,500-seater stadium after him – the Estádio Municipal Sérgio Conceição. He fathered five sons: Sérgio, Rodrigo, Moisés, Francisco and José.

Conceição helped ten families who were struggling financially during the COVID-19 pandemic, with the intent of providing "a grocery store in every home". During an interview to RTP1 in December 2020, he stated that his hero was God and he was a devout Catholic.

Career statistics

Club

International

Scores and results list Portugal's goal tally first, score column indicates score after each Conceição goal.

Managerial statistics

Honours

Player
Leça
Segunda Liga: 1994–95

Porto
Primeira Liga: 1996–97, 1997–98, 2003–04
Taça de Portugal: 1997–98
Supertaça Cândido de Oliveira: 1996

Lazio
Serie A: 1999–2000
Coppa Italia: 1999–2000, 2003–04
Supercoppa Italiana: 1998
UEFA Cup Winners' Cup: 1998–99
UEFA Super Cup: 1999

Portugal
UEFA European Championship third place: 2000
UEFA European Under-18 Championship runner-up: 1992

Individual
Belgian Golden Shoe: 2005

Manager
Porto
Primeira Liga: 2017–18, 2019–20, 2021–22
Taça de Portugal: 2019–20, 2021–22
Taça da Liga: 2022–23
Supertaça Cândido de Oliveira: 2018, 2020, 2022

Individual
Primeira Liga Best Coach: 2017–18, 2019–20, 2021–22

References

External links

1974 births
Living people
Portuguese Roman Catholics
Sportspeople from Coimbra
Portuguese footballers
Association football wingers
Primeira Liga players
Liga Portugal 2 players
Associação Académica de Coimbra – O.A.F. players
F.C. Penafiel players
Leça F.C. players
F.C. Felgueiras players
FC Porto players
Serie A players
S.S. Lazio players
Parma Calcio 1913 players
Inter Milan players
Belgian Pro League players
Standard Liège players
Qadsia SC players
Super League Greece players
PAOK FC players
Portugal youth international footballers
Portugal under-21 international footballers
Portugal international footballers
UEFA Euro 2000 players
2002 FIFA World Cup players
Portuguese football managers
Primeira Liga managers
S.C. Olhanense managers
Associação Académica de Coimbra – O.A.F. managers
S.C. Braga managers
Vitória S.C. managers
FC Porto managers
Ligue 1 managers
FC Nantes managers
Portuguese expatriate footballers
Portuguese expatriate football managers
Portuguese expatriate sportspeople in Italy
Expatriate footballers in Italy
Portuguese expatriate sportspeople in Belgium
Expatriate footballers in Belgium
Portuguese expatriate sportspeople in Kuwait
Expatriate footballers in Kuwait
Portuguese expatriate sportspeople in Greece
Expatriate footballers in Greece
Portuguese expatriate sportspeople in France
Expatriate football managers in France
Standard Liège non-playing staff